The 2019 national road cycling championships will be held throughout the year and are organised by the UCI member federations. They began in New Zealand with the time trial event (both men and women) on 4 January, as is tradition.

Jerseys

The winner of each national championship wears the national jersey in all their races for the next year in the respective discipline, apart from the World Championships and the Olympics, or unless they are wearing a category leader's jersey in a stage race. Most national champion jerseys tend to represent a country's flag or use the colours from it. Jerseys may also feature traditional sporting colours of a country that are not derived from a national flag, such as the green and gold on the jerseys of Australian national champions.

2019 champions

Men's Elite

Champions in UCI WorldTour teams

Women's Elite

Champions in UCI Women's teams

References

National Cycling Championships, 2019
National road cycling championships by year